Andrien "Andy" Fuller (born September 8, 1974) is a 6'4" 295 lb former American football player, who primarily played tight end.

Early years
Fuller attended J.O. Johnson High School in Huntsville before signing to play at Auburn University. Fuller enjoyed success at Auburn, including being a member of the undefeated 1993 team and receiving first team All-SEC honors in 1994 and 1995. He is perhaps best known for his part in Auburn's upset versus No. 1 ranked Florida on October 15, 1994, where Andy had 7 receptions for 115 yards and a touchdown. During his career at Auburn (1992–1995), he caught 33 passes for 513 yards and five touchdowns.

Professional career
Fuller entered the 1996 NFL Draft but went undrafted and subsequently signed as an unrestricted free agent with the Miami Dolphins in April 1996. He was waived by the Dolphins later that year and spent the 1997 season with the Barcelona Dragons of NFL Europe, who were the World Bowl Champions after defeating Rhein Fire in World Bowl V. Fuller's next stop brought him back home to Alabama to spend the 1999 season with the Mobile Admirals of the Regional Football League. In 2000, Fuller joined the Tennessee Valley Vipers of the Arena Football League af2, where he played five seasons and was a key offensive and defensive player in a five-year run that saw the club post a 63–17 record. Tennessee Valley won four straight division titles, made the playoffs each season, and competed in the ArenaCup finals in 2000. Fuller played in 73 games and caught 54 passes for 573 yards and 28 touchdowns on offense, and as a defensive lineman recorded 95 tackles, 14.5 tackles-for-loss of 53 yards, 15.5 sacks for 88 yards, two interceptions, eight pass break ups, nine forced fumbles and five fumble recoveries. These statistics have cemented his place in Tennessee Valley history, currently ranked third all-time in sacks and second in forced fumbles, prompting the franchise to retire Fuller's number (#82) on June 11, 2005.

On October 1, 2006, WHNT-TV announced Andy Fuller would co-host a weekly discussion with former Alabama tailback Chris Anderson showcasing upcoming Alabama/Auburn games. The program is set to air Fridays at 6PM CDT.

References

1974 births
Living people
Players of American football from Alabama
Sportspeople from Huntsville, Alabama
American football tight ends
Auburn Tigers football players
Barcelona Dragons players
Regional Football League players